Argna biplicata is a species of air-breathing land snail, a terrestrial pulmonate gastropod mollusk in the family Argnidae.

Subspecies
 Argna biplicata biplicata (Michaud, 1831)
 Argna biplicata excessiva (Gredler, 1856)
 Argna biplicata ulterior Klemm, 1962

Distribution 
This species occurs in countries including:
 Austria
 France
 Italy

References

 Bank, R. A.; Neubert, E. (2017). Checklist of the land and freshwater Gastropoda of Europe. Last update: July 16, 2017

Argnidae
Gastropods described in 1831